Efthymis Argyropoulos (born 22 April 1990) is a Greek professional footballer who plays as a midfielder for Super League 2 club Panachaiki.

References

1990 births
Living people
Greek footballers
Super League Greece 2 players
Football League (Greece) players
Gamma Ethniki players
Paniliakos F.C. players
Panegialios F.C. players
Kalamata F.C. players
Panachaiki F.C. players
Doxa Drama F.C. players
Episkopi F.C. players
Association football midfielders
Footballers from Patras